This is a complete list of episodes from the original animated television show Babar, which was based on the famous book series for children, Babar the Elephant. The series aired from Sunday, April 2, 1989 to Wednesday, June 5, 1991 on CBC on their CBC Television block (seasons 1-3) and Global TV (seasons 4-5).

Series overview
{|class=wikitable style="text-align:center"
! colspan=2| Season
! Episodes
! First aired
! Last aired
! Network
|-
| style="width:5px; background:#81D8D0"|
| [[List of Babar episodes#Season 1 (1989)|1]]
| 13
| 
| 
| rowspan=3| CBC Television
|-
| bgcolor="FF54C1"|
| [[List of Babar episodes#Season 2 (1989)|2]]
| 13
| 
|  
|-
| bgcolor="00BB00"|
| [[List of Babar episodes#Season 3 (1990)|3]]
| 13
| 
| 
|-
| bgcolor="FFFF00"|
| [[List of Babar episodes#Season 4 (1991)|4]]
| 13
| 
| 
| rowspan=2| Global TV
|-
| bgcolor="8D8DFF"|
| [[List of Babar episodes#Season 5 (1991)|5]]
| 13
| 
| 
|}

Episodes

Season 1 (1989)

Season 2 (1989)

Season 3 (1990)

Season 4 (1991)

Season 5 (1991)

References

Lists of Canadian children's animated television series episodes